In Indonesia, a fire performance is a group of performance arts or skills that involve the manipulation of fire. Fire performance in Indonesia (Indonesian: Pertunjukan Api) reflects the country's diversity of ethnicities and cultures. There are more than 1,300 ethnic groups in Indonesia. Each ethnic group has its own performances: there are many fire performance forms in Indonesia. Fire performance has various styles of performance including fire dancing; the use of fire as a finale in an otherwise non-fire performance; and the use of fire skills. Performances can be done as choreographed routines to music (this type being related to dance).

Variation

Pepe-Pepeka ri Makka 

Pepe'-pepeka ri Makka is a traditional Makassar fire dance originating from South Sulawesi, Indonesia. In various literatures, the narrative of the early entry of Islam in South Sulawesi can be traced back to the 17th century AD, the spread of Islam was carried out through the arts or culture of the local community. Thus, Pepe'-pepeka ri Makka is a dance that uses fire and is associated with the “symbol” of Islam. this definition can refer to the song lyrics performed by the dancer. The verse pieces that accompany the Pepe'-pepeka ri Makka dance are believed to be the source of the dancers' strength. The term "strength" also refers to the historical aspects surrounding this dance. It is said that the aesthetic rhythms from motion to the sung poetry are an attempt to illustrate the story of Prophet Ibrahim AS, who, by Allah's will, was able to make peace  with fire. the movements of the Pepe'-pepeka ri Makka dancers are related to the efforts to express the feelings, intentions and thoughts of the  Makassar people who were united and passionate in fighting for common sovereignty and in the effort to spread Islam.

Candle dance

The candle dance (Indonesian: Tari Lilin, Minangkabau: Tarian Lilin) is a dance originating from West Sumatra, Indonesia. this is performed by a group of dancers accompanied by a group of musicians. The dancers carry burning candles on plates that are held in the palms of each. Candle dance has movements that are not haphazard or very selective. Because in addition to showing the dancer's elegance in the sparkling candle light, the movement chosen must be one that is not excited or not too attractive so that the candle held by the dancer doesn't fall or the wax drops don't melt anywhere.  This means that the dance does not require a lot of movement and only requires full concentration so that anyone can do it. The dance is played by carrying candles on hands and in groups that have bowing, graceful movements and also prayer movements. This illustrates the atmosphere of a group of village girls helping their friends to find the missing engagement ring. So that this dance contains drama and stories.

Zapin Api

Zapin Api (lit: "Zapin of Fire"; Jawi: زاڤين اڤي) is a firedance technique of the classical Malay Zapin founded in Pulau Rupat Utara, Bengkalis, Riau, Indonesia. The legend attested that Pulau Rupat was cursed under a series of catastrophes in the 1500s and a harmonious balance between all of the elements should be called for in order to restore peace in the area. This led the islanders under the leadership of Panglima Sage Dagendang to seek the assistance from the four Pawang Besar (Great Mystique) of four natural elements: earth, fire, wind and water. The mystique agreed upon their request and summoned the jins (spirits) from the each respective elements for reconciliation.

All of the jins accepted the invitation to meet with the mystique, except the fire spirit. He demanded that he only would arrive in the entourage with a condition, that a special celebration would be held for him. The fire spirit sets the rules and regulations for the performance, together with the condition that the elements of fire should be used in the dance and added mantra that the mortals should abide during the performance, thus signifying birth of the Zapin api. There are several strict rituals that must be adhered to by the ringleader, players and even the spectators. All the dancers, musicians and the instruments are required bathed upon a sacred water and smoked by mantras a few days before the performance. The performance begins when the participants reciting prayers with the burning incense. The leader recite his mantras and commencing the Malay orchestra in the background to summon the spirits. He intensifies his mantras as the music plays along.
The players dance along with the orchestra, slowly one by one succumbed into a spellbinded position and drawn directly into the fire.

Sanghyang

Sanghyang dance is a sacred dance which is a pre-Hindu cultural heritage that aims to ward off evil. Sanghyang dance is a dance of spiritual communication between humans and the supernatural by singing praise songs to the accompaniment of beats. In this dance there are always three important elements, namely; Api (fire), gending sanghyang and dancers and sanghyang dances that are commonly performed in Bali consist of; Sanghyang Dedari, Sanghyang Deling, Sanghyang Bojog, Sanghyang Jaran, Sanghyang Sampat and Sanghyang Bojog.

Kecak Dance

Kecak is a form of Balinese Hindu dance and music drama that was developed in Bali, Indonesia. The kecak dance is typically performed by about fifty to one hundred men wearing only loincloths; their upper bodies are left bare. They form concentric circles, in the middle of which is a traditional Balinese coconut oil lamp. First they move their bodies rhythmically to the left and to the right, chanting the words "chak ke-chak ke-chak ke-chak" continuously, in slow rhythm. Gradually the rhythm speeds up and by turns they lift their hands, trembling, into the air. The kecak dance is performed for dance-dramas and the story presented is taken from the Ramayana Hindu epic. Trance rituals often accompany certain sections of the kecak dance, such as during the portrayal of the burning of Hanuman. Here, the dancer playing Hanuman is blessed by a priest and enters a trance state for the fire kicking dance which follows. The dancer does not feel any pain from the fire because he is in a state of trance.

Gallery

See also

 Dance in Indonesia
 Culture of Indonesia
 Fire performance

References

Dance in Indonesia